The 1844 United States elections elected the members of the 29th United States Congress, and took place during the Second Party System in the midst of the debate over whether to annex Texas. Texas and Iowa joined the union during the 29th Congress. Democrats retained control of the House and took back control of the Presidency and the Senate, re-establishing the dominant position the party had lost in the 1840 election.

In the Presidential election, Democratic former Speaker of the House James K. Polk defeated Whig former Senator Henry Clay of Kentucky. Though Polk won the popular vote by a little over one percent, he won by a comfortable margin in the electoral college. James G. Birney of the nascent Liberty Party took two percent of the popular vote, and may have swung the election by taking votes from Clay in New York. The little-known Polk defeated several rivals to win his party's nomination, emerging as the first dark horse nominee in U.S. presidential history. Incumbent President John Tyler, who had been expelled from the Whig party early in his presidency, was briefly the candidate of the newly formed Democratic-Republican Party, but dropped out of the race after Polk announced his support for ratification of Tyler's Texas annexation treaty. 

In the House, Whigs picked up a small number of seats, but Democrats retained a commanding majority.

In the Senate, Democrats picked up several seats, re-taking the majority.

See also
1844 United States presidential election
1844–45 United States House of Representatives elections
1844–45 United States Senate elections

References

1844 elections in the United States
1844